Wambrook is a village and civil parish in the Blackdown Hills, Somerset, England. The parish includes the hamlets of Higher Wambrook and Lower Wambrook which is sometimes known as Haselcombe.

Ferne Animal Sanctuary is in the west of the parish.

History
In the west of the parish at Wortheal there are substantial earthworks which may date from the Iron Age.

Until 1895 Wambrook was part of the Beaminster Forum and Redhone Hundred in Dorset, only after that becoming part of Somerset.

Notable people
Samuel Vickery, recipient of the Victoria Cross

Governance
The parish council has responsibility for local issues, including setting an annual precept (local rate) to cover the council’s operating costs and producing annual accounts for public scrutiny. The parish council evaluates local planning applications and works with the local police, district council officers, and neighbourhood watch groups on matters of crime, security, and traffic. The parish council's role also includes initiating projects for the maintenance and repair of parish facilities, as well as consulting with the district council on the maintenance, repair, and improvement of highways, drainage, footpaths, public transport, and street cleaning. Conservation matters (including trees and listed buildings) and environmental issues are also the responsibility of the council.

The village falls within the Non-metropolitan district of South Somerset, which was formed on 1 April 1974 under the Local Government Act 1972, having previously been part of Chard Rural District. The district council is responsible for local planning and building control, local roads, council housing, environmental health, markets and fairs, refuse collection and recycling, cemeteries and crematoria, leisure services, parks, and tourism.

Somerset County Council is responsible for running the largest and most expensive local services such as education, social services, libraries, main roads, public transport, policing and  fire services, trading standards, waste disposal and strategic planning.

It is also part of the Yeovil county constituency represented in the House of Commons of the Parliament of the United Kingdom. It elects one Member of Parliament (MP) by the first past the post system of election.

Religious sites
The Church of St Mary dates from the 13th century and has been designated by English Heritage as a Grade II* listed building. In the churchyard are a 17th-century set of stocks.

References

External links

Villages in South Somerset
Civil parishes in Somerset